Gonioctena nivosa is a species of leaf beetle in the family Chrysomelidae. It is found in Europe and Northern Asia (excluding China).

Subspecies
These three subspecies belong to the species Gonioctena nivosa:
 Gonioctena nivosa alberta Brown, 1952
 Gonioctena nivosa arctica Mannerheim, 1853
 Gonioctena nivosa nivosa

References

Further reading

 
 

Chrysomelinae
Articles created by Qbugbot
Beetles described in 1851